A Delta ISO is used to update an ISO image which contains RPM Package Manager files. It makes use of DeltaRPMs (a form of Delta compression) for RPMs which have changed between the old and new versions of the ISO. Delta ISOs can save disk space and download time, as a Delta ISO only contains the things that were updated in the new version of the ISO. After downloading the Delta ISO, a user can use it to update the outdated ISO. Some RPM-based Linux distributions such as Fedora and openSUSE make use of this technique.

External links
 Fedora
openSUSE

Linux package management-related software
SUSE Linux